Saint-François is a town and commune in the French overseas department of Guadeloupe, located in the southeast point of the main island of Grande-Terre.

Settlements include Chassaing, and Dubedou.

There are four public preschools and eight public primary schools.

The Collège Alexandre Macal is a public junior high school.

Population

La Pointe des Châteaux
La Pointe des Châteaux is a peninsula that extends into the Atlantic Ocean.

Eleven kilometres east of Saint-François, a large littoral strip, La Pointe des Châteaux hosts rare fauna and flora, some of which are indigenous to the site.

It attracts about 500,000 visitors per year. North-west of the Pointe des Châteaux's clifftop is beach les Grandes Salines.

References

Gallery

External links
 Office de Tourisme de Saint François – Official site of the Saint-François Tourism Board

Communes of Guadeloupe
Populated places in Guadeloupe